Wymeer is a village in the municipality of Bunde in the district of Leer in Lower Saxony, Germany.

References 

Villages in Lower Saxony